Aduva Gombe is a 2019 Indian Kannada-language drama film written and directed by S. K. Bhagavan of the famed duo Dorai–Bhagavan, who returns to film direction after 22 years. Produced under the banner Kasthuri Nivasa Creations, the film is jointly funded by Shivappa A and Venugopal K. The film stars Sanchari Vijay and Rishita Malnad. The supporting cast includes Ananth Nag and Sudha Belawadi among others. The film's score and soundtrack is composed by Hemanth Kumar and cinematography is by Ganesh.

The film released across Karnataka on 4 January 2019 and marked the first release for the year in Kannada cinema.

Cast 
 Sanchari Vijay as Madhava
 Ananth Nag as Kishan
 Rishita Malnad
 Sudha Belawadi as Rukmini
 Nirosha Shetty

Soundtrack 

Voilin Hemant Kumar has scored the music for the film. The audio was released among much fanfare on 26 October 2018 and is owned by actor Puneeth Rajkumar's PRK Audio label. All three brother actors Shiva Rajkumar, Raghavendra Rajkumar and Puneeth Rajkumar along with their cousin actor Vijay Raghavendra have lent their voices for the songs.

Reception

Critical response 

Sunayana Suresh of The Times of India scored the film at 2 out of 5 stars and says "If you are expecting some of the magic of the vintage Dorai-Bhagwan films, this might not really live up to the expectations. But if you want some soppy emotions and retro style filmmaking, you might like parts of it."Vijaya Karnataka scored the film at 2 out of 5 stars and says "Traveler Vijay has done well in emotional situations. Shivrajkumar, Puneeth, Raghavendra Rajkumar and Vijaya Raghavendra have sung for the first time in a single film. Those who like retro style cinema can watch cinema."

References

External links 
 
 Aduva Gombe official page

2019 films
2010s Kannada-language films
Indian drama films
Films set in Karnataka
Films shot in Karnataka
2019 drama films
Films directed by S. K. Bhagavan